George Hewitt (born 1878; date of death unknown) was an English footballer who played as an inside-forward for Burslem Port Vale and Luton Town.

Career
Hewitt joined local club Burslem Port Vale in the autumn of 1896. He made his debut at inside-right in a 6–0 defeat by Rushden at the Athletic Ground in a Midland League match on 14 November. He was released at the end of the 1897–98 season and went on to play for Luton Town.

Career statistics
Source:

References

1878 births
Sportspeople from Burslem
English footballers
Association football inside forwards
Port Vale F.C. players
Luton Town F.C. players
Midland Football League players
English Football League players
Year of death missing